Mr. Osomatsu, known in Japan as Osomatsu-san, is a 2015 anime television series directed by Yoichi Fujita and produced by Pierrot, based on Fujio Akatsuka's Osomatsu-kun manga series. Celebrating Akatsuka's 80th birthday, the series follows the sextuplet Matsuno brothers as they now start living as adults.

The first season aired between October 6, 2015, and March 29, 2016, and was simulcast by Crunchyroll. Following its broadcast, the first episode was removed from streaming and is replaced by an original video animation episode in its home video release. A special episode, produced in collaboration with the Japan Racing Association, aired on December 12, 2016. In the end of special episode, the message "See You Again" was appeared as the endcard.

The second season aired in Japan between October 3, 2017, and March 27, 2018. The third season aired in Japan between October 13, 2020, and March 30, 2021.

Series overview

Episodes

Season 1 (2015–16)

Season 2 (2017–18)

Season 3 (2020–21)

Notes

References

Mr. Osomatsu